The 2022 Laurence Olivier Awards were held on 10 April 2022 at the Royal Albert Hall and hosted by Jason Manford. They were the first Oliviers to be held since 2020 due to the complete shutdown of UK theatres in 2020/2021 as a result of lockdowns caused by the COVID-19 pandemic. Due to this, the eligibility period was expanded from 19 February 2020 to 22 February 2022. The green carpet, hosted by Emma B, Angellica Bell, Frank DiLella and Anita Rani, was livestreamed on YouTube and the Olivier ceremony itself was broadcast in full on Magic with hosts Alice Arnold and Ruthie Henshall. Highlights from the show were broadcast on ITV.

Event calendar 
2 February: In-person event hosted by Jason Manford and venue confirmed at the Royal Albert Hall announcement
8 March: Nominations announcement by Miriam-Teak Lee and Sam Tutty
24 March: Special Recognition Award recipients announced
10 April: Award ceremony held

Presenters
Jade Anouka
Floella Benjamin
Don Black
Anne-Marie Duff
Noma Dumezweni
Tom Felton
Kit Harrington
Max Harwood
Ruthie Henshall
Cassidy Janson
Beverley Knight
Bonnie Langford
Miriam-Teak Lee
Oti Mabuse
Arlene Phillips
Jonathan Pryce
Keala Settle
Ranj Singh
Giles Terera
Sam Tutty
Eric Underwood
Layton Williams

Performances
Samantha Barks, Stephanie McKeon and the cast of Frozen – "For the First Time in Forever/Let It Go"
Beverley Knight and the cast of The Drifters Girl – "Kissin' in the Back Row of the Movies/Harlem Child/You're More than a Number in my Little Red Book"
Hiran Abeysekera and the cast of Life of Pi
Kerry Ellis and the cast of Anything Goes – "Anything Goes"
Olly Dobson, Cedric Neal and the cast of Back to the Future
Arinzé Kene and the cast of Get Up, Stand Up – "Get Up, Stand Up"
"State Anthem of Ukraine"
Amy Lennox from Cabaret – "Cabaret"
The cast of Dear Evan Hansen – "For Forever/You Will Be Found" (in memoriam)
Clive Carter and the cast of Moulin Rouge – "Welcome to the Moulin Rouge"
The cast of Spring Awakening – "The Song of Purple Summer"
Tanisha Spring, Jon Tsouras and the covers & swings of the West End "Our Time"

Winners and nominees
The nominations were announced on 8 March 2022 in 26 categories.

{| class="wikitable" width="100%"
|-
!width="50%" |Best New Play
!width="50%" |Best New Musical
|-
|valign="top" |
Life of Pi by Lolita Chakrabarti (based on original text by Yann Martel) – Wyndham's Theatre2:22 A Ghost Story by Danny Robins – Noël Coward Theatre
Best of Enemies by James Graham – Young Vic
Cruise by Jack Holden – Duchess Theatre
|valign="top" |Back to the Future – Adelphi TheatreFrozen – Theatre Royal, Drury Lane
Get Up, Stand Up – Lyric Theatre
Moulin Rouge – Piccadilly Theatre
The Drifters Girl – Garrick Theatre
|-
!width="50%" |Best Revival
!width="50%" |Best Musical Revival
|-
|valign="top" |Constellations – Donmar Warehouse at Vaudeville TheatreA Number – Old Vic
The Normal Heart – National Theatre Olivier
The Tragedy of Macbeth – Almeida Theatre
|valign="top" |Cabaret – Playhouse TheatreAnything Goes – Barbican Theatre
Spring Awakening – Almeida Theatre
|-
!width="50%" |Best Entertainment or Comedy Play
!width="50%" |Best Family Show
|-
|valign="top" |Pride and Prejudice** (**sort of) by Isobel McArthur – Criterion Theatre*Pantoland at the Palladium by Michael Harrison – London PalladiumThe Choir of Man by Nic Doodson and Andrew Kay – Arts TheatreThe Shark Is Broken by Joseph Nixon and Ian Shaw – Ambassadors Theatre
|valign="top" |'Wolf Witch Giant Fairy  – Royal Opera House, Linbury TheatreBillionaire Boy – Garrick Theatre
Dragons and Mythical Beasts – Regent's Park Open Air Theatre
What the Ladybird Heard – Palace Theatre
|-
!width="50%" |Best Actor
!width="50%" |Best Actress
|-
|valign="top" |Hiran Abeysekera as Pi Patel in Life of Pi – Wyndham's TheatreBen Daniels as Ned Weeks in The Normal Heart – National Theatre Olivier
Omari Douglas as Manuel in Constellations – Donmar Warehouse at Vaudeville Theatre
Charles Edwards as Gore Vidal in Best of Enemies – Young Vic
|valign="top" |Sheila Atim as Marianne in Constellations – Donmar Warehouse at Vaudeville TheatreLily Allen as Jenny in 2:22 A Ghost Story – Noël Coward Theatre
Emma Corrin as Anna in Anna X – Harold Pinter Theatre
Cush Jumbo as Hamlet in Hamlet – Young Vic
|-
!width="50%" |Best Actor in a Musical
!width="50%" |Best Actress in a Musical
|-
|valign="top" |Eddie Redmayne as Emcee in Cabaret – Playhouse TheatreOlly Dobson as Marty McFly in Back to the Future – Adelphi Theatre
Arinzé Kene as Bob Marley in Get Up, Stand Up – Lyric Theatre
Robert Lindsay as Moonface Martin in Anything Goes – Barbican Theatre
|valign="top" |Jessie Buckley as Sally Bowles in Cabaret – Playhouse TheatreSutton Foster as Reno Sweeney in Anything Goes – Barbican Theatre
Beverley Knight as Faye Treadwell in The Drifters Girl – Garrick Theatre
Stephanie McKeon as Anna in Frozen – Theatre Royal, Drury Lane
|-
!Best Actor in a Supporting Role
!Best Actress in a Supporting Role
|-
|valign="top" |Fred Davis, Daisy Franks, Romina Hytten, Tom Larkin, Habib Nasib Nader, Tom Stacy and Scarlet Wilderink as the Tiger in Life of Pi – Wyndham's TheatreDino Fetscher as Felix Turner in The Normal Heart – National Theatre Olivier
Nathaniel Parker as Henry VIII in The Mirror and the Light – Gielgud Theatre
Danny Lee Wynter as Tommy Boatwright in The Normal Heart – National Theatre Olivier
|valign="top" |Liz Carr as Dr. Emma Brookner in The Normal Heart – National Theatre OlivierTori Burgess as Lydia Bennet in Pride and Prejudice** (**sort of) – Criterion Theatre
Christina Gordon as Jane Bennet in Pride and Prejudice** (**sort of) – Criterion Theatre
Akiya Henry as Lady Macduff in The Tragedy of Macbeth – Almeida Theatre
|-
!Best Actor in a Supporting Role in a Musical
!Best Actress in a Supporting Role in a Musical
|-
|valign="top" |Elliot Levey as Herr Schultz in Cabaret – Playhouse TheatreClive Carter as Harold Zidler in Moulin Rouge – Piccadilly Theatre
Hugh Coles as George McFly in Back to the Future – Adelphi Theatre
Gary Wilmot as Elisha J. Whitney in Anything Goes – Barbican Theatre
|valign="top" |Liza Sadovy as Fraulein Schneider in Cabaret – Playhouse TheatreGabrielle Brooks as Rita Marley in Get Up, Stand Up – Lyric Theatre
Victoria Hamilton-Barritt as Stepmother in Cinderella – Gillian Lynne Theatre
Carly Mercedes Dyer as Irma in Anything Goes – Barbican Theatre
|-
!Best Director
!Best Theatre Choreographer
|-
|valign="top" |Rebecca Frecknall for Cabaret – Playhouse TheatreMichael Longhurst for Constellations – Donmar Warehouse at Vaudeville Theatre
Kathleen Marshall for Anything Goes – Barbican Theatre
Max Webster for Life of Pi – Wyndham's Theatre
|valign="top" |Kathleen Marshall for Anything Goes – Barbican TheatreFinn Caldwell for Life of Pi – Wyndham's Theatre
Julia Cheng for Cabaret – Playhouse Theatre
Sonya Tayeh for Moulin Rouge – Piccadilly Theatre
|-
!Best Set Design
!Best Costume Design
|-
|valign="top" |Tim Hatley for scenic designing and Nick Barnes and Finn Caldwell for puppetry designing Life of Pi – Wyndham's TheatreTim Hatley  for scenic designing and Finn Ross for video designing Back to the Future – Adelphi Theatre
Derek McLane for Moulin Rouge – Piccadilly Theatre
Tom Scutt for Cabaret – Playhouse Theatre
|valign="top" |Catherine Zuber for Moulin Rouge – Piccadilly TheatreJon Morrell for Anything Goes – Barbican Theatre
Christopher Oram for Frozen – Theatre Royal, Drury Lane
Tom Scutt for Cabaret – Playhouse Theatre
|-
!Best Lighting Design
!Best Sound Design
|-
|valign="top" |Andrzej Goulding and Tim Lutkin for Life of Pi – Wyndham's TheatreNeil Austin for Frozen – Theatre Royal, Drury Lane
Isabella Byrd for Cabaret – Playhouse Theatre
Tim Lutkin for Back to the Future – Adelphi Theatre
|valign="top" |Nick Lidster for Cabaret – Playhouse TheatreIan Dickinson for 2:22 A Ghost Story – Noël Coward Theatre
Carolyn Downing for Life of Pi – Wyndham's Theatre
Gareth Owen for Back to the Future – Adelphi Theatre
|-
!colspan=2 |Best Original Score or New Orchestrations
|-
| colspan=2 valign="top" |Simon Hale for orchestrating Get Up, Stand Up – Lyric TheatreGlen Ballard and Alan Silvestri for scoring and lyricising and Bryan Crook and Ethan Popp for orchestrating Back to the Future – Adelphi Theatre
David Chase, Bill Elliott and Rob Fisher for orchestrating Anything Goes – Barbican Theatre
Andrew T. Mackay for composing Life of Pi – Wyndham's Theatre
|-
!Best New Dance Production
!Outstanding Achievement in Dance
|-
|valign="top" |Revisor by Crystal Pite and Jonathon Young, Kidd Pivot – Sadler's WellsDraw from Within by Wim Vandekeybus, Rambert Dance Company – Sadler's Wells
Transverse Orientation by Dimitris Papaioannou – Dance Umbrella and Sadler's Wells
|valign="top" |Arielle Smith for choreographing Jolly Folly in Reunion, English National Ballet – Sadler's WellsAcosta Danza for De Punta a Cabo in 100% Cuban – Sadler's Wells
Dancers for performing in NDT2 Tour – Sadler's Wells
Edward Watson for performing in The Dante Project by Wayne McGregor – Royal Ballet at Royal Opera House
|-
!Best New Opera Production
!Outstanding Achievement in Opera
|-
|valign="top" |Jenůfa, Royal Opera – Royal Opera HouseBajazet, Irish National Opera and Royal Opera – Linbury Theatre, Royal Opera House
The Cunning Little Vixen, English National Opera – London Coliseum
Theodora, Royal Opera – Royal Opera House
|valign="top" |Peter Whelan and the Irish Baroque Orchestra for Bajazet, Irish National Opera and Royal Opera – Linbury Theatre, Royal Opera HouseChristine Rice for performing in 4/4 – Royal Opera House
takis for scenic and costume designing HMS Pinafore, English National Opera – London Coliseum
|-
!colspan=2 |Outstanding Achievement in an Affiliate Theatre
|-
| colspan=2 valign="top" |Old Bridge – Bush Theatre10 Nights – Bush Theatre
A Place for We – Park Theatre
Folk – Hampstead Theatre Downstairs
The Invisible Hand – Kiln Theatre
|-
!colspan=2 |Special Recognition Award
|-
|valign="top" colspan=2 |Lisa BurgerBob KingGloria LouisSusie SainsburySylvia Young'|}

Productions with multiple wins and nominations
 Multiple wins 
The following 3 productions received multiple awards:

7: Cabaret5: Life of Pi2: ConstellationsMultiple nominations
The following 14 productions and 1 opera received multiple nominations:

11: Cabaret9: Anything Goes, Life of Pi7: Back to the Future5: Moulin Rouge, The Normal Heart4: Constellations, Frozen, Get Up, Stand Up3: 2:22 A Ghost Story, Pride and Prejudice* (*sort of)2: Bajazet, Best of Enemies, The Drifters Girl, The Tragedy of Macbeth''

See also
75th Tony Awards

References

External links
Olivier Awards official website

Laurence Olivier Awards
Laurence Olivier Awards
Laurence Olivier Awards ceremonies
2022 in London
April 2022 events in the United Kingdom
Events at the Royal Albert Hall